Sigismondo di Giovanni (died 1540) was an Italian architect in Naples, Italy, working in the Renaissance style.

It was him who designed the nobile Seggio di Nido (1507) and the cupola for the church of San Severino e Sossio.  He was a pupil of Giovanni Francesco Mormando. In Seggio di Nido there are still Gothic influences remaining.

Sources

1540 deaths
16th-century Italian architects
Architects from Naples
Year of birth unknown